Following is the list of schools in state of Tamil Nadu in India.

 A.P.J.M. Matriculation Higher Secondary School, Kanyakumari District
 A.R.L.M. Matriculation Higher Secondary School, Cuddalore
 AKT Academy Matriculation Higher Secondary School, Kallakurichi
 Aiyas Matriculation Higher Secondary School, Thirukkalachery, Nagapattinam District
 Akshararbol International School, Chennai, T-nagar
 American College Higher Secondary School, Madurai
 Arignar Anna Government Higher Secondary School, Kumbakonam
 Balavihar Matriculation Higher Secondary School, Panruti
 Bapuji Memorial School, Kanyakumari
 Bharathi Matriculation Higher Secondary School (Kallakurichi)
 Bharathiar Government Higher Secondary School, Veeravanallur
 Breeks Memorial School, Charing Cross, Ooty
 Campion Anglo-Indian Higher Secondary School, Trichy
 Carmel Higher Secondary School, Nagercoil
 Carmel High School (Nagercoil)
 Chennai Public School, Chennai
 Christhu Jyothi Matric Higher Secondary School, Erode
 De Britto Higher Secondary School, Devakottai
 G V School, Chidambaram
 G. K. Shetty Hindu Vidyalaya Matriculation Higher Secondary School
 GRG Matriculation Higher Secondary School, Coimbatore
 Good Shepherd International School, Ooty
 Government Higher Secondary School, Velliyanai
 Hajee Meera Academy
 Hebron School, Ooty
 Ilayangudi Higher Secondary School, Ilaiyangudi
 Infant Jesus Matriculation Higher Secondary School, Palladam
 International Community School and Junior College, Kotagiri
 J.K.K.Nattraja Matriculation Higher Secondary School
 John Paul Higher Secondary School,  Dindigul 
 Jaycees Matriculation Higher Secondary School, Kangeyam
 Kings Matriculation Higher Secondary School, Madipakkam
 Kendriya Vidyalaya, Aruvankadu, Ooty
 Kendriya Vidyalaya, Indunagar, Ooty
 Lakshmi School, Madurai
 Lawrence School, Lovedale
 Lisieux Matriculation Higher Secondary School, Coimbatore
 Loaba Nursery and Primary School, Mudivaithanendal, Thooththukkudi
 Loyola Academy, Maraimalai Nagar, Chennai
 Loyola Higher Secondary School, Kuppayanallur
 MCTM Chidambaram Chettyar International IB School, Chennai
 Mahajana High School, Erode
 Mahatma Montessori Matriculation Higher Secondary School
 Maria Rafols School, Kanyakumari
 Morning Star Higher Secondary School, Gudalur
 MSP Solai Nadar Memorial Higher Secondary school, Dindigul
 National Higher Secondary School Mannargudi

 N.S.N. Matriculation Higher School Chennai
  N.S.N Memorial Senior Secondary School Chennai
 P.S. Higher Secondary School, Chennai
 Perks Matriculation Higher Secondary School, Coimbatore
 Ponnu Matriculation Higher Secondary School, Dharapuram
 R. S. Krishnan Higher Secondary School
 Railway Colony Municipal Higher Secondary School
 Railway Mixed Higher Secondary School, Golden Rock, Tiruchirappalli
 Rice City Matriculation Higher Secondary School
 SBOA School & Junior College, Chennai
 SBOA High School, Coimbatore
 Sishya School, Chennai
 SMB Matriculation School, Dindigul
 SMSV. Hr. Sec School
 Sacred Heart Matriculation School,  Kayyunni, Gudalur
 Sainik School, Amaravathinagar
 Seth Bhaskar Matriculation Higher Secondary School, Ambattur
 Sethupathi Higher Secondary School, Madurai
 Sishya School, Chennai
 South Street Hindu Nadar Higher Secondary School	
 Sri Raasi Vinayaga school
 St. Antony's Higher Secondary School, Sholavandan
 St. Antony's Higher Secondary School, Thanjavur
 St. Antony's Matriculation Higher Secondary School, Srivilliputhur
 St. Arul Anandar School, Oriyur
 St. George's School, Chennai
 St. Joseph's Boys School, Coonoor
 St. Joseph Boys Higher Secondary School, Trichy
 St. Joseph's Matriculation Higher Secondary School, Coimbatore
 St. Joseph's Higher Secondary School, Ooty
 St. Jude's Public School & Junior College, Kotagiri
 St. Mary's Anglo-Indian Higher Secondary School, Chennai
 St. Mary's Higher Secondary School, Dindigul
 St. Mary’s Higher Secondary School, Madurai
 St. Mary's Higher Secondary School, Vickramasingapuram
 St. Patrick's Anglo Indian Higher Secondary School, Chennai
 St. Paul's Matriculation Higher Secondary School, Neyveli
 St. Xavier's Higher Secondary School, Palayamkottai
 St. Xavier's Higher Secondary School, Thoothukudi
 Stanes Anglo Indian Higher Secondary School, Coimbatore
 Stanes Anglo Indian Higher Secondary School, Coonoor
 Sundravalli Memorial School
 Tansri Ubaidulla Matriculation Higher Secondary School, Rajaghiri
 The Laidlaw Memorial School and Junior College, Ketti
 Town Higher Secondary School, Kumbakonam
 Trinity Academy, Namakkal
 Valliammal Matriculation Higher Secondary School
 Velankanni Matriculation And Higher Secondary School
 Vellayan Chettiyar Higher Secondary School
 Woodside School, Ooty

 American International School Chennai
 Bethlahem Matric School, Karungal
 Government Higher Secondary School, Peruvilai
 Hindu Senior Secondary School, Indira Nagar
 Kavi Bharathi Vidyalaya, Thiruvottiyur, chennai
 Mrs. Bullmore School, Coonoor
 New Prince Matriculation Higher Secondary School, Chennai
 Sri Jai Vikas Public School, Ulagapuram.
 Sri Ramakrishna Mission Vidyalaya Matriculation Higher Secondary School, Chengalpattu
 Sri Ramakrishna Mission Vidyalaya Boys Higher Secondary School, Chengalpattu
 Sri Ramakrishna Mission Vidyalaya Girls Higher Secondary School, Chengalpattu
 St. Michael Matric Higher Secondary School, Ariyakudi
 Thambu Higher Secondary School, Coimbatore
 Titan School , Hosur
 Vijay Millennium CBSE school,Sogathur, Dharmapuri 
 Vivekananda Memorial Matriculation School, Ooty

References 

Lists of schools in Tamil Nadu